Tree crop refers to any crop produced by a tree including:

 Timber or lumber, wood processed into beams and planks
 Tree fruit, fruit borne on various flowering trees
 Tree nut, a tree fruit composed of an inedible hard shell and an edible seed

See also
 Tree farm, a privately owned forest managed for timber production
 Tree plantation, a large-scale estate meant for farming tree products
 Crop tree release, selecting particularly desirable trees in a young stand and removing or killing other trees
 Agroforestry, system in which trees or shrubs are grown around or among crops
 Silviculture, the care of forests
 Arboriculture, the care of individual, typically ornamental, trees